Jacek Jerzy Tomczak (born July 27, 1973, in Poznań) is a Polish politician and lawyer.  He is a member of the Sejm for Poland Comes First, having been a member for Law and Justice from 2005 to 2010.

He was elected to Sejm on 25 September 2005 getting 17991 votes in Poznań, standing for Law and Justice (PiS).  He joined Poland Comes First when that party split from PiS in 2010.

On 13 October 2022, Tomczak joined the newly-launched Centre for Poland, which will be part of the Polish Coalition.

See also
Members of Polish Sejm 2005-2007

References

External links
Jacek Tomczak - parliamentary page - includes declarations of interest, voting record, and transcripts of speeches.

1973 births
Living people
Politicians from Poznań
Poland Comes First politicians
Law and Justice politicians
Members of the Polish Sejm 2005–2007
Members of the Polish Sejm 2007–2011
Members of the Polish Sejm 2011–2015
Members of the Polish Sejm 2015–2019
Members of the Polish Sejm 2019–2023
Adam Mickiewicz University in Poznań alumni